Arbat is a pedestrian zone in Almaty, Kazakhstan. It is located on Jibek Joly Street, between Abylai Khan Avenue and Nazarbayev Street. The zone features many stores such as TsUM, or Silk Way shopping mall and kiosks.

History
Created in the late 1980s, Arbat was the first area in Almaty to be turned into a pedestrian zone. The name is taken from Moscow's Arbat Street. The zone was reconstructed in 2017, and now features fountains and is connected to Panfilov Street Promenade. It is planned to extend the pedestrian area to Seyfullin Prospect.

References

Streets in Almaty
Pedestrian streets in Almaty
Tourist attractions in Almaty